The 2006 Eastern Michigan Eagles football team represented Eastern Michigan University during the 2006 NCAA Division I FBS football season.  Eastern Michigan competed as a member of the Mid-American Conference (MAC) West Division.  The team was coached by Jeff Genyk and played their homes game in Rynearson Stadium.

Schedule

References

Eastern Michigan
Eastern Michigan Eagles football seasons
Eastern Michigan Eagles football